The Billboard Tropical Songs chart is a music chart that ranks the best-performing tropical songs of the United States. Published by Billboard magazine, the data are compiled by Nielsen Broadcast Data Systems based on each single's weekly airplay.

Chart history

See also
 List of number-one Billboard Hot Tropical Songs of 2004
 List of number-one Billboard Hot Latin Tracks of 2003
 List of number-one Billboard Hot Latin Pop Airplay of 2003

References

2003
United States Tropical Songs
2003 in Latin music